Micromelo is a genus of sea snails, bubble snails, marine opisthobranch gastropod mollusks in the family Aplustridae.

Species
Species within the genus Micromelo include:
 Micromelo guamensis (Quoy & Gaimard, 1825)
 Micromelo undatus  (Bruguière, 1792)
Soecies brought into synonymy
 Micromelo eximia (Deshayes, 1863): synonym of Micromelo guamensis (Quoy & Gaimard, 1825)
 Micromelo undata [sic]: synonym of Micromelo undatus (Bruguière, 1792) (incorrect gender ending)

References

 Vaught, K.C.; Tucker Abbott, R.; Boss, K.J. (1989). A classification of the living Mollusca. American Malacologists: Melbourne. ISBN 0-915826-22-4. XII, 195 pp

External links
 Pilsbry, H. A. (1893-1895). Manual of conchology, structural and systematic, with illustrations of the species. Ser. 1. Vol. 15: Polyplacophora (Chitons). Acanthochitidae, Cryptoplacidae and appendix. Tectibranchiata. pp 1-463, pls 1-58
 Gofas, S.; Le Renard, J.; Bouchet, P. (2001). Mollusca. in: Costello, M.J. et al. (eds), European Register of Marine Species: a check-list of the marine species in Europe and a bibliography of guides to their identification. Patrimoines Naturels. 50: 180-213
 Spencer H.G., Willan R.C., Marshall B.A. & Murray T.J. (2011). Checklist of the Recent Mollusca Recorded from the New Zealand Exclusive Economic Zone

Aplustridae